Haar may refer to:
 Haar (fog), fog or sea mist (Scottish English)
 Haar, Bavaria, a municipality near Munich, Germany
 Haar (Westphalia), a hill range in North Rhine-Westphalia, Germany

People with the surname
 Alfréd Haar (1885–1933), Hungarian mathematician
 Jarrod Haar, New Zealand organisational psychology academic

See also
 De Haar (disambiguation)
 Haar wavelet, the first wavelet
 Haar measure, a set-theoretic measure
 Haar-like feature, a technique in computer vision